Karl Winfrid Eikenberry (born November 10, 1951) is a retired United States Army lieutenant general who served as the U.S. Ambassador to Afghanistan from April 2009 to July 2011. From 2011 to 2019, he was the Director of the U.S. Asia Security Initiative at the Walter H. Shorenstein Asia-Pacific Research Center and a Stanford University professor of the practice; a member of the Core Faculty at the Center for International Security and Cooperation; and an affiliated faculty member at the Freeman Spogli Institute for International Studies, Center on Democracy, Development and the Rule of Law, and The Europe Center.

Eikenberry is a Fellow of the American Academy of Arts and Sciences where he co-directs the Academy's multiyear project on civil wars, violence, and international responses, and a member of the Academy's Committee of International Security Studies. He serves on the board of The Asia Foundation, American Councils for International Education, the Asia Society of Northern California, Academic Exchange, and the National Committee on American Foreign Policy. He is a faculty member of Schwarzman College, Tsinghua University in Beijing, and a member of the Working Group on Science and Technology and U.S.-China Relations organized by the UC San Diego 21st Century China Center and the Asia Society’s Center on U.S.-China Relations. Additionally, Eikenberry is a member of the Council on Foreign Relations, the American Academy of Diplomacy, and Institute for International Strategic Studies.

Early life and education
Eikenberry was born in 1951 in Hammond, Indiana and graduated from Goldsboro High School in Goldsboro, North Carolina, in 1969. He then attended the United States Military Academy at West Point, where he was commissioned as a Second Lieutenant upon graduation in 1973.

He received an M.A. in East Asian Studies from Harvard University, where he would later return as a National Security Fellow at the John F. Kennedy School of Government. He also earned an M.A. in political science from Stanford University. In addition, Eikenberry has studied in Hong Kong at the UK Ministry of Defence Chinese Language School, earning the British Foreign and Commonwealth Office's Interpreter's Certificate for Mandarin Chinese, and at Nanjing University, earning an advanced degree in Chinese history.

Military career

In the Army, Eikenberry commanded and held staff positions in airborne, ranger, and mechanized infantry units in the United States, Korea, and Europe. He also served as Assistant Army Attaché and later as the Defense Attaché in the United States Embassy in Beijing, People's Republic of China. His other political-military assignments included Senior Country Director for China and Taiwan in the Office of Secretary of Defense, Foreign Area Officer Division Chief and Deputy Director of the   Strategy, Plans and Policy Directorate on the Army Staff, and Director of Strategic Planning and Policy Directorate, United States Pacific Command, Camp Smith, Hawaii.
Eikenberry served two tours of duty in the war in Afghanistan. His first tour in Afghanistan, from September 2002 to September 2003, he filled two positions—his primary duty was as the U.S. Security Coordinator for Afghanistan and the second position was the Chief of the Office of Military Cooperation-Afghanistan (OMC-A). As the Security Coordinator, he worked closely with Special Representative of the UN Secretary-General for Afghanistan and Pakistan Lakhdar Brahimi to forge a unified international effort to build a cohesive security sector.Security sector reform (SSR) followed a lead-nation approach agreed upon in January 2002, in which the G8 nations would each lead a specific sector—the United States was responsible for the Afghan National Army; Germany, the Afghan Police; UK, counter-narcotics; Italy, judicial reform; and Japan and the United Nations took on the task of disarming, demobilizing, and reintegrating the militias. In his role as Chief of the OMC-A he was the chief architect of the strategy that established the new Afghan National Army.

Eikenberry succeeded Lieutenant General David Barno as Commander, Combined Forces Command-Afghanistan, on May 4, 2005. During his second tour from May 2005 to February 2007, he was responsible for transferring operational responsibility for southern and eastern Afghanistan to the NATO International Security Assistance Force and the international training of the Afghan National Army and Police Forces. He also commanded the military task force sent to Pakistan to provide humanitarian assistance and disaster relief in the wake of the October 8th, 2005 Kashmir earthquake. He completed his military career in Brussels, Belgium as the Deputy Chairman of the NATO Military Committee.

U.S. Ambassador to Afghanistan

On January 29, 2009, the New York Times reported that President Barack Obama had chosen Eikenberry to be the next U.S. ambassador to Afghanistan, replacing William Braucher Wood. The choice of a career army officer for the sensitive post was described by The Times as "highly unusual". On April 3, 2009, the Senate confirmed Eikenberry's nomination, and on April 29, 2009, he was sworn in as the U.S. Ambassador to Afghanistan. The official announcement of his nomination was made on March 11. Following his confirmation as ambassador, he retired from the U.S. military with the rank of Lieutenant General on April 28, 2009. As the U.S. Ambassador to Afghanistan, he led the civilian surge directed by President Obama, overseeing the growth of the embassy staff from 350 to 1,400 civilian personnel from eighteen United States Government departments and agencies, and the administration of bilateral development assistance budget of over $4 billion USD annually.

Leak of classified cables

In November 2009, Eikenberry sent two classified cables to his superiors in which he assessed the proposed U.S. strategy in Afghanistan. A description of the content of the cables was leaked soon after. In January 2010, the New York Times obtained and published the cables, which "show just how strongly the current ambassador feels about President Hamid Karzai and the Afghan government, the state of its military, and the chances that a troop buildup will actually hurt the war effort by making the Karzai government too dependent on the United States". In June 2010, General McChrystal was described in a Rolling Stone profile as feeling blindsided by Eikenberry's statements in the leaked cables. On the other hand, Eikenberry is described elsewhere as being frank and vocal about his concerns about the Karzai government as being an unreliable partner for the United States in its efforts in Afghanistan.

Career at Stanford University 

In September 2011 Eikenberry became the Payne Distinguished Lecturer at the Freeman Spogli Institute for International Studies at Stanford University and subsequently the William J. Perry Fellow in International Security at the Center for International Security and Cooperation. While at Stanford University, Eikenberry joined the faculty of the Ford Dorsey Program in International Policy Studies, served as a member of the American Academy of Arts and Sciences congressionally mandated Commission on the Humanities and Social Sciences, acted as a consultant for NATO and the RAND Corporation, and lectured and written on civil-military relations, U.S. Asia-Pacific strategy and Sino American relations, counter-insurgency and state-building strategies, and the contribution of the arts and humanities to America's international competitiveness. He was elected to be a member of the American Academy of Arts and Sciences in 2012.

Writings

Awards and decorations

Personal decorations and badges
Eikenberry's personal decorations include:

Non-U.S. service medals and ribbons
  NATO Medal for Former Yugoslavia

Foreign military and civil decorations
  Meritorious Service Cross (M.S.C.) Canada
  Cross of Merit of the Minister of Defence of the Czech Republic, First Class 
 Alliance Medal (Hungary)
 French Officer Order of the Legion of Honor
  State Medal of Ghazi Amir Amanullah Khan (Afghanistan)
 State Medal of Ghazi Wazir Mohammad Akbar Khan (Afghanistan)

Foreign badges
 German Parachutist Badge in silver

Academic Awards
Harvard Graduate School of Arts and Sciences Centennial Medal

Honorary Doctorate of Humane Letters Degree, North Carolina State University 

Honorary Doctorate of Laws Degree, Ball State University 

Honorary Doctorate of Humane Letters Degree, University of San Francisco

Other
George F. Kennan Award for Distinguished Public Service

State of North Carolina Order of the Long Leaf Pine Award 

Goldsboro High School Athletic Hall of Fame 

In August 2007 Eikenberry was given the key to the city of Goldsboro, North Carolina by the mayor.

In November 2018, Eikenberry was the Keynote Speaker at the Stanford Model United Nations Conference.

References

External links
Karl Eikenberry at Stanford, including his publications
The Runaway General:Stanley McChrystal, Obama's top commander in Afghanistan, Rolling Stone (June 22, 2010)
Former general talks on U.S., war The Tartan, Carnegie Mellon University, September 13, 2013.
Eikenberry and Michael McFaul on Foreign Policy, Stanford University, November 11, 2014.

Interviews
Interview with Asia Source (May 2, 2006)
Interview with NPR (February 13, 2007)
Afghanistan: A Campaign Assessment at Harvard Institute of Politics (March 20, 2007)
Interview at the 25th Anniversary Chicago Humanities Festival (November 8, 2014).

1951 births
Living people
Harvard Graduate School of Arts and Sciences alumni
Harvard Kennedy School staff
Recipients of the Legion of Merit
United States Army personnel of the War in Afghanistan (2001–2021)
United States Army generals
United States Military Academy alumni
Officiers of the Légion d'honneur
People from Goldsboro, North Carolina
Ambassadors of the United States to Afghanistan
Recipients of the Defense Superior Service Medal
Fellows of the American Academy of Arts and Sciences
Recipients of the Defense Distinguished Service Medal
United States military attachés
National Bureau of Asian Research
The Asia Foundation
21st-century American diplomats